In fluid dynamics, stream thrust averaging is a process used to convert three-dimensional flow through a duct into one-dimensional uniform flow.  It makes the assumptions that the flow is mixed adiabatically and without friction.  However, due to the mixing process, there is a net increase in the entropy of the system.  Although there is an increase in entropy, the stream thrust averaged values are more representative of the flow than a simple average as a simple average would violate the second Law of Thermodynamics.

Equations for a perfect gas
Stream thrust:

Mass flow:

Stagnation enthalpy:

Solutions
Solving for  yields two solutions.  They must both be analyzed to determine which is the physical solution.  One will usually be a subsonic root and the other a supersonic root.  If it is not clear which value of velocity is correct, the second law of thermodynamics may be applied.

Second law of thermodynamics:

The value of entropy is not necessary, only that the value is positive.

One possible unreal solution for the stream thrust averaged velocity yields a negative entropy.  Another method of determining the proper solution is to take a simple average of the velocity and determining which value is closer to the stream thrust averaged velocity.

References
 

Equations of fluid dynamics
Fluid dynamics